The following radio stations broadcast on AM frequency 920 kHz: 920 AM is a Regional broadcast frequency.

Canada

Mexico
  in Lázaro Cárdenas, Michoacán
  in Tampico, Tamaulipas
  in Huentitan el Bajo (Guadalajara), Jalisco
  in Ojo Seco, Guanajuato
  in Tenabo, Campeche
  in San Bernardino Tlaxcalancingo, Puebla

Paraguay
ZP1 at Asunción.

United States

References

Lists of radio stations by frequency